Myoxanthus exasperatus is a species of orchid native to Central America and tropical South America.

References

External links 

exasperatus
Orchids of Central America
Orchids of South America